Mandello del Lario is an Italian town and comune in the province of Lecco, in Lombardy, on Lake Como.

Since 1921, Mandello del Lario has been home to Moto Guzzi—the Italian motorcycle manufacturer, now a subsidiary of  Piaggio & Co. SpA.  The town each year since 2001 has hosted GMG (a.k.a. Giornata Mondiale Guzzi or Worldwide Guzzi Days).

The Grigna massif is located in Mandello's communal territory.

Saint George's church 
Saint George's church has a single hall with a visible truss ceiling and a quadrangular apse with a cross-vaulted ceiling. Its present aspect is due to restoration work which began in the 14th century, to a building which had already existed since the 11th century.

A holy-water font decorated with a geometrical twisting floral motif (very popular in the Como area between the 6th and 11th century) on the font and with a relief (not very prominent) showing a cross on the sides, is preserved from the original building.

In the nave are numerous votive frescoes dating back to the 15th century; the Crucifixion in the presbytery is from the end of the 15th century; the eschatological cycle, according to some researchers, is related to the Ligurian-Piedmontese  painting tradition, whilst according to others it is closer to the local tradition, and is placed around 1480.

See also
 Moto Guzzi
 Moto Guzzi Museum
 Sanctuary of Beata Vergine del Fiume

References

External links 

Official website